Jerome is an unincorporated community in Jerome Township, Union County, Ohio, United States.

A former variant name of Jerome was Frankfort. Frankfort was laid out and platted in 1846. A post office called Jerome was established on April 17, 1848, but was discontinued on December 15, 1905.  The mail service is now sent through the Plain City branch.

References 

Unincorporated communities in Union County, Ohio
Unincorporated communities in Ohio